Tremors video game may refer to:
Tremors: The Game (2002-2003) Cancelled game that was going to be designed by Rock Solid Studios.
Dirt Dragons (2004) Based on the film Tremors 4: The Legend Begins.